Rhagium is a genus of flower longhorn beetles in the family Cerambycidae, Cerambycidae.

Classification
 Subgenus: Hagrium Villiers, 1978 
 Species: Rhagium bifasciatum Fabricius, 1775
 Subgenus: Megarhagium Reitter, 1913 
 Species: Rhagium caucasicum Reitter, 1889
 Species: Rhagium elmaliense Schmid, 1999
 Species: Rhagium fasciculatum Faldermann, 1837
 Species: Rhagium iranum Heller, 1924
 Species: Rhagium mordax (DeGeer, 1775)
 Species: Rhagium phrygium Daniel, 1906
 Species: Rhagium pygmaeum Ganglbauer, 1881
 Species: Rhagium sycophanta (Schrank, 1781)
 Species: Rhagium syriacum Pic, 1892
 Subgenus: Rhagium Fabricius, 1775 
 Species: Rhagium americanum Podany, 1964
 Species: Rhagium canadense Podany, 1964
 Species: Rhagium cariniventre Casey, 1913
 Species: Rhagium femorale Ohbayashi, 1994
 Species: Rhagium heyrovskyi Podaný, 1964
 Species: Rhagium inquisitor (Linnaeus, 1758)
 Species: Rhagium japonicum Bates, 1884
 Species: Rhagium lineatum (Olivier, 1795)
 Species: Rhagium mexicanum Casey, 1913
 Species: Rhagium montanum Casey, 1913
 Species: Rhagium morrisonense Kano, 1933
 Species: Rhagium pseudojaponicum Podaný, 1964
 Species: Rhagium quadricostatus Podany, 1964
 Species: Rhagium quinghaiensis Chen & Chiang, 2000

Gallery

References

Lepturinae
Beetles of Europe
Beetles of North America
Articles containing video clips